Ashleigh Vaughn (born 17 May 1999) is a South African water polo player, and coach. She is a member of the South Africa women's national water polo team. She was part of the team in the women's water polo tournament at the 2020 Summer Olympics, held July–August 2021 in Tokyo.

She participated at the 2016 FINA World Women's Youth Water Polo Championships, and 2017 FINA World Women's Junior Waterpolo Championships.

References 

1999 births
Living people
South African female water polo players
Olympic water polo players of South Africa
Water polo players at the 2020 Summer Olympics
20th-century South African women
21st-century South African women